The Range may refer to:

The Range (University of Virginia), a building at the University of Virginia 
The Range (musician), the professional name for electronic musician James Hinton
The Range, Queensland, a locality in Australia
The Range Convent and High School
The Range (retailer), a British retail company
The Range, South Australia, a locality in Australia
Bruce Hornsby and the Range, a musical group

See also
Range (disambiguation)